Bhanwar is a sci-fi thriller series starring Karanvir Bohra, Priya Banerjee, Teejay Sidhu, Payal Sodhi and Mantra in key roles. The web series marks the directional debut of TV actor, Karanvir Bohra. Its about a couple who moves into a new apartment and discovers that the place is already occupied by their own ghosts, it also focuses on the theme of time travel. The web series was released on 18 August 2020 on ZEE5 OTT platform.

Premise
The plot revolves around the lives of a husband and wife who move in to a new house where they encounter mysterious incidents. However, they soon learn that their new house is occupied by their own ghosts. Things get complicated when they realize that they have time travelled six months in future and
that they were killed by the estate agent, who is a serial killer.

Cast
Karanvir Bohra as Ranvir Makhija
Teejay Sidhu as Samantha Phoenix
Priya Banerjee as Kanika Makhija
Mantra as Rodrigues
Payal Sodhi as Jo

Release
The trailer was released on 13 August 2020 while the web series premiered on ZEE5 on 18 August 2020.

Reception

Shefali Jha from IBTimes termed the series as a suspenseful ride and discussed further on the plot.

References

Indian science fiction television series
2020 Indian television series debuts
ZEE5 original programming
Indian web series
Indian thriller television series